Lafontaine (also known as Lafontaine—Rosemont) was a federal electoral district in Quebec, Canada, that was represented in the House of Commons of Canada from 1949 to 1979.

This riding was created in 1947 from parts of Hochelaga, St. James and St. Mary ridings. It consisted of a part of the city of Montreal.

The riding's name was changed in 1975 to "Lafontaine—Rosemont", and the riding was abolished in 1976 when it was redistributed into Hochelaga, Laurier, Maisonneuve and Rosemont ridings.

Members of Parliament

This riding elected the following Members of Parliament:

Election results

See also 

 List of Canadian federal electoral districts
 Past Canadian electoral districts

External links

Riding history from the Library of Parliament:
Lafontaine
Lafontaine-Rosemont

Former federal electoral districts of Quebec